Air Business A/S, later Maersk Commuter I/S, was a Danish regional airline which operated between 1981 and 1990. It was the first Danish airline to break the Scandinavian Airlines System (SAS) international monopoly and gain a concession to fly an international scheduled service out of Denmark. Air Business was based at Esbjerg Airport and operated a fleet at first of an Embraer EMB 110 Bandeirante and from 1984 two Short 360s.

The airline started its service from Esbjerg via Thisted Airport to Stavanger Airport, Sola. Air Business was bought by Maersk Air in 1984 and it then replaced Thisted with Aalborg Airport. In addition to the scheduled service, the airline provided wet lease operations to the mother airline. It took the Maersk Commuter name in 1988 and merged with Maersk Air in 1990.

History

Scandinavian Airlines System (SAS) had a monopoly on all international scheduled traffic from Denmark since its establishment in 1961 . Although some flights stopped off at Aarhus, all international traffic had to go through SAS' hub of Copenhagen Airport.

Air Business was established by Peter Alkærsig, a former Second World War fighter pilot and later worked as a commercial pilot in SAS. He founded Air Business at an age of 75 in 1981 and was able to secure the first international scheduled Danish route concession not held by SAS. The route, which commenced in 1982, ran from Esbjerg via Thisted to Stavanger, Norway. The airline initially procured an Embraer EMB 110 Bandeirante for the route.

The background for the concession was the gradual deregulation of the European airline market, which was being carried out by the European Union. This first stage of this took effect in 1982, when airlines were free to operate any routes then wanted between two or more secondary airports, as determined by the authorities.

Maersk Air was at the time looking for opportunities to expand their network internationally and opted to purchase the airline. This also allowed Maersk to market itself with an international scheduled route. The agreement was struck in May 1983. Upon buying the airline, Maersk initiated an order in December for two Short 360s. The following year the route was moved. It still started and terminated at Esbjerg and Stavanger, but the stopover was moved to Aalborg Airport, which served a much larger catchment area.

With the delivery of the Shorts aircraft, Air Business was able to supplement its operations by providing wet lease services to its parent. Air Business retained its name until 1988, when it was renamed Maersk Commuter. Maersk Air hoped the move would better communicate the connection between the two airlines. Operations ceased on 31 March 1990 and were incorporated into Maersk Air's regular operations. The Shorts were sold and instead the route was flown with Maersk Air's Fokker 50s.

Destinations
The airline had its head office and base of operations at Esbjerg Airport in Esbjerg Municipality, Denmark. It operated a combination of scheduled services and wet lease to its parent. The company had 60 employees in 1988.

Fleet
The following aircraft were operated by the airline:

References

Defunct airlines of Denmark
Airlines established in 1981
Airlines disestablished in 1990
Danish companies established in 1981
Companies based in Esbjerg Municipality
Maersk Air
1990 disestablishments in Denmark